Chernovskaya is a rural locality (a village) in Nizhneslobodskoye Rural Settlement, Vozhegodsky District, Vologda Oblast, Russia. The population was 94 as of 2002.

Geography 
Chernovskaya is located 47 km east of Vozhega (the district's administrative centre) by road. Derevenka is the nearest rural locality.

References 

Rural localities in Vozhegodsky District